Nikolai Aleksanteri Alho (born 12 March 1993) is a Finnish professional footballer who plays as a right-back for Greek Super League club Volos.

Alho was born and raised in Finland but also carries British citizenship.

Club career

A product of his local side HJK, Alho came through its reserves, Klubi-04, before signing a professional contract on 2011, keeping him with the Helsinki-based side until 2014.

On 13 June 2013, he played his first league game for HJK and went on scoring twice in a 6−0 home win over FC Inter. Soon after performing well at HJK, he signed a contract that was effective until the end of 2015.

In 2014 HJK qualified for the Europa League group stage. Alho scored the decisive goal against Rapid Wien, in the qualifying match.

Alho moved to Allsvenskan side Halmstads BK in January 2017. After a difficult season the team was relegated back to Superettan.

Alho moved back to HJK for the 2018 season. After a successful season HJK won the Veikkausliiga. This was Alho's 4th domestic championship.

During the 2018 season Alho was also played as a right back by former HJK manager Mika Lehkosuo. Alho, known for his speed, aggressiveness and crossing ability, he was a perfect fit for a modern-day right back. Alho made the switch and had a successful season as right back during the 2019 season.

He signed for Hungarian Nemzeti Bajnokság I side MTK at the beginning of the 2021 winter transfer window.

He signed for Greek Super League Greece club Volos F.C. at the beginning of the 2022 winter transfer window, after his release from MTK.

International career

He made his senior debut for the Finland national football team on 24 January 2014 at Nizwa Sports Complex in Nizwa, Oman, in a friendly match against Oman.

Alho was called up for the UEFA Euro 2020 pre-tournament friendly match against Sweden on 29 May 2021.

Honours
HJK
Veikkausliiga: 2018, 2020
Finnish Cup: 2020  

Individual
Veikkausliiga Team of the Year: 2020

Outside football
Alho is also well known for making music. His debut single "Standing Right Here" went viral on YouTube and also hit radio stations in Finland in 2013. Alho was noticed by JVG the same year and signed a deal with their label, PME Records and WMG in December 2013. His contract with PME Records and WMG ended in November 2014. Alho has stated that he will continue to make music as a hobby but not sign again with a major label until after his football career is over. Football is and always has been his first priority.

Alho is also the owner of an independent record label, 325 Media. Other owners include Jesse Joronen and Valtteri Moren.

Personal life 
Alho's biological father is Ghanaian and his mother is Finnish. He was adopted soon after by his English mother and Finnish father and was raised in Espoo with his younger sister, also adopted. He is a native speaker of both English and Finnish.

Alho attended the International School of Helsinki for the majority of his childhood, before transferring to Sports High School, Mäkelänrinteen Lukio.

References

  Profile at palloverkko.palloliitto.fi

External links

1993 births
Living people
Footballers from Helsinki
Association football defenders
Finnish footballers
Finland youth international footballers
Finland under-21 international footballers
Finland international footballers
Finnish adoptees
Finnish people of Ghanaian descent
FC Honka players
Klubi 04 players
Helsingin Jalkapalloklubi players
FC Lahti players
Halmstads BK players
MTK Budapest FC players
Volos N.F.C. players
Super League Greece players
Veikkausliiga players
Ykkönen players
Kakkonen players
Allsvenskan players
Nemzeti Bajnokság I players
UEFA Euro 2020 players
Finnish expatriate footballers
Finnish expatriate sportspeople in Sweden
Expatriate footballers in Sweden
Finnish expatriate sportspeople in Hungary
Expatriate footballers in Hungary
Finnish expatriate sportspeople in Greece
Expatriate footballers in Greece